Virus is a video game developed by Hudson/Sega and published by Hudson for the Sega Saturn. It was adapted into an anime series named Virus Buster Serge.

Gameplay
Virus is a game that features a mix of animation drawn using an anime style and computer graphics.

Reception
Next Generation reviewed the Saturn version of the game, rating it two stars out of five, and stated that "Even if expectations surrounding this game weren't so high, Hudson has failed to please in almost every respect. If Virus is the disease, then someone should work to find a vaccine, and fast."

Reviews
Game.EXE #11 (Nov 1997)
Computer Gaming World #166 (May 1998)
Joypad Oct 1997

References

1997 video games
Action-adventure games
First-person video games
Japan-exclusive video games
Sega Saturn games
Sega Saturn-only games
Video games developed in Japan